The 2011 Huntingdonshire District Council election took place on 5 May 2011 to elect members of Huntingdonshire District Council in Cambridgeshire, England. One third of the council was up for election and the Conservative Party stayed in overall control of the council.

After the election, the composition of the council was:
Conservative 41
Liberal Democrats 8
UK Independence Party 2
Independent 1

Background
The leader of the council, Conservative Ian Bates, stood down at the election, with Jason Ablewhite being chosen as the new leader by the Conservative group on the council in March 2011 defeating Doug Dew. Other councillors who stood down at the election included Mike Newman who has been a member of the council since the 1970s and the deputy leader of the council Mike Simpson. The Conservatives, Liberal Democrats and Labour contested most seats along with a number of candidates from the UK Independence Party and one independent in St Ives South.

Election result
The Conservatives gained 4 seats from the Liberal Democrats to win 19 of the 22 seats on the council that were contested. The Liberal Democrats won only 2 seats at the election, with the party losing Kendal Cooper in St Neots Priory Park and Gordon Thorpe in St Neots Eaton Socon, as well as seats in Fenstanton and Huntingdon North. Meanwhile, the UK Independence Party won 1 seat in Ramsey, but also took control of Ramsey Town Council, the first council the party took control of in the United Kingdom. Labour failed to win any seats, but did get an increased vote share and got within 41 votes in Huntingdon North.

Ward results

References

2011 English local elections
2011
2010s in Cambridgeshire